The United States Navy, United States Coast Guard, and United States National Oceanic and Atmospheric Administration (NOAA) use a hull classification symbol (sometimes called hull code or hull number) to identify their ships by type and by individual ship within a type. The system is analogous to the pennant number system that the Royal Navy and other European and Commonwealth navies use.

History

United States Navy 
The U.S. Navy began to assign unique Naval Registry Identification Numbers to its ships in the 1890s. The system was a simple one in which each ship received a number which was appended to its ship type, fully spelled out, and added parenthetically after the ship's name when deemed necessary to avoid confusion between ships. Under this system, for example, the battleship Indiana was USS Indiana (Battleship No. 1), the cruiser Olympia was USS Olympia (Cruiser No. 6), and so on. Beginning in 1907, some ships also were referred to alternatively by single-letter or three-letter codes—for example, USS Indiana (Battleship No. 1) could be referred to as USS Indiana (B-1) and USS Olympia (Cruiser No. 6) could also be referred to as USS Olympia (C-6), while USS Pennsylvania (Armored Cruiser No. 4) could be referred to as USS Pennsylvania (ACR-4). However, rather than replacing it, these codes coexisted and were used interchangeably with the older system until the modern system was instituted on 17 July 1920.

During World War I, the U.S. Navy acquired large numbers of privately owned and commercial ships and craft for use as patrol vessels, mine warfare vessels, and various types of naval auxiliary ships, some of them with identical names. To keep track of them all, the Navy assigned unique identifying numbers to them. Those deemed appropriate for patrol work received section patrol numbers (SP), while those intended for other purposes received "identification numbers", generally abbreviated "Id. No." or "ID;" some ships and craft changed from an SP to an ID number or vice versa during their careers, without their unique numbers themselves changing, and some ships and craft assigned numbers in anticipation of naval service were never acquired by the Navy. The SP/ID numbering sequence was unified and continuous, with no SP number repeated in the ID series or vice versa so that there could not be, for example, both an "SP-435" and an "Id. No. 435". The SP and ID numbers were used parenthetically after each boat's or ship's name to identify it; although this system pre-dated the modern hull classification system and its numbers were not referred to at the time as "hull codes" or "hull numbers," it was used in a similar manner to today's system and can be considered its precursor.

United States Revenue Cutter Service and United States Coast Guard 
The United States Revenue Cutter Service, which merged with the United States Lifesaving Service in January 1915 to form the modern United States Coast Guard, began following the Navy's lead in the 1890s, with its cutters having parenthetical numbers called Naval Registry Identification Numbers following their names, such as (Cutter No. 1), etc. This persisted until the Navy's modern hull classification system's introduction in 1920, which included Coast Guard ships and craft.

United States Coast and Geodetic Survey 

Like the U.S. Navy, the United States Coast and Geodetic Survey – a uniformed seagoing service of the United States Government and a predecessor of the National Oceanic and Atmospheric Administration (NOAA) – adopted a hull number system for its fleet in the 20th century. Its largest vessels, "Category I" oceanographic survey ships, were classified as "ocean survey ships" and given the designation "OSS". Intermediate-sized "Category II" oceanographic survey ships received the designation "MSS" for "medium survey ship," and smaller "Category III" oceanographic survey ships were given the classification "CSS" for "coastal survey ship." A fourth designation, "ASV" for "auxiliary survey vessel," included even smaller vessels. In each case, a particular ship received a unique designation based on its classification and a unique hull number separated by a space rather than a hyphen; for example, the third Coast and Geodetic Survey ship named Pioneer was an ocean survey ship officially known as USC&GS Pioneer (OSS 31). The Coast and Geodetic Surveys system persisted after the creation of NOAA in 1970, when NOAA took control of the Surveys fleet, but NOAA later changed to its modern hull classification system.

United States Fish and Wildlife Service 

The Fish and Wildlife Service, created in 1940 and reorganized as the United States Fish and Wildlife Service (USFWS) in 1956, adopted a hull number system for its fisheries research ships and patrol vessels. It consisted of "FWS" followed by a unique identifying number. In 1970, NOAA took control of the seagoing ships of the USFWS's Bureau of Commercial Fisheries, and as part of the NOAA fleet they eventually were renumbered under the NOAA hull number system.

The modern hull classification system

United States Navy 

The U.S. Navy instituted its modern hull classification system on 17 July 1920, doing away with section patrol numbers, "identification numbers", and the other numbering systems described above. In the new system, all hull classification symbols are at least two letters; for basic types the symbol is the first letter of the type name, doubled, except for aircraft carriers.

The combination of symbol and hull number identifies a modern Navy ship uniquely. A heavily modified or re-purposed ship may receive a new symbol, and either retain the hull number or receive a new one. For example, the heavy gun cruiser  was converted to a gun/missile cruiser, changing the hull number to CAG-1. Also, the system of symbols has changed a number of times both since it was introduced in 1907 and since the modern system was instituted in 1920, so ships' symbols sometimes change without anything being done to the physical ship.

Hull numbers are assigned by classification. Duplication between, but not within, classifications is permitted. Hence, CV-1 was the aircraft carrier  and BB-1 was the battleship .

Ship types and classifications have come and gone over the years, and many of the symbols listed below are not presently in use. The Naval Vessel Register maintains an online database of U.S. Navy ships showing which symbols are presently in use.

After World War II until 1975, the U.S. Navy defined a "frigate" as a type of surface warship larger than a destroyer and smaller than a cruiser. In other navies, such a ship generally was referred to as a "flotilla leader", or "destroyer leader". Hence the U.S. Navy's use of "DL" for "frigate" prior to 1975, while "frigates" in other navies were smaller than destroyers and more like what the U.S. Navy termed a "destroyer escort", "ocean escort", or "DE". The United States Navy 1975 ship reclassification of cruisers, frigates, and ocean escorts brought U.S. Navy classifications into line with other nations' classifications, at least cosmetically in terms of terminology, and eliminated the perceived "cruiser gap" with the Soviet Navy by redesignating the former "frigates" as "cruisers".

Military Sealift Command 
If a U.S. Navy ship's hull classification symbol begins with "T-", it is part of the Military Sealift Command, has a primarily civilian crew, and is a United States Naval Ship (USNS) in non-commissioned service – as opposed to a commissioned United States Ship (USS) with an all-military crew.

United States Coast Guard 
If a ship's hull classification symbol begins with "W", it is a commissioned cutter of the United States Coast Guard. Until 1965, the Coast Guard used U.S. Navy hull classification codes, prepending a "W" to their beginning. In 1965, it retired some of the less mission-appropriate Navy-based classifications and developed new ones of its own, most notably WHEC for "high endurance cutter" and WMEC for "medium endurance cutter".

National Oceanic and Atmospheric Administration 
The National Oceanic and Atmospheric Administration (NOAA), a component of the United States Department of Commerce, includes the National Oceanic and Atmospheric Administration Commissioned Officer Corps (or "NOAA Corps"), one of the eight uniformed services of the United States, and operates a fleet of seagoing research and survey ships. The NOAA fleet also uses a hull classification symbol system, which it also calls "hull numbers," for its ships.

After NOAA took over the former fleets of the U.S. Coast and Geodetic Survey and the U.S. Fish and Wildlife Service Bureau of Commercial Fisheries in 1970, it adopted a new system of ship classification. In its system, the NOAA fleet is divided into two broad categories, research ships and survey ships. The research ships, which include oceanographic and fisheries research vessels, are given hull numbers beginning with "R", while the survey ships, generally hydrographic survey vessels, receive hull numbers beginning with "S". The letter is followed by a three-digit number; the first digit indicates the NOAA "class" (i.e., size) of the vessel, which NOAA assigns based on the ship's gross tonnage and horsepower, while the next two digits combine with the first digit to create a unique three-digit identifying number for the ship.

United States Navy hull classification codes 

The U.S. Navy's system of alpha-numeric ship designators, and its associated hull numbers, have been for several decades a unique method of categorizing ships of all types: combatants, auxiliaries and district craft. Although considerably changed in detail and expanded over the years, this system remains essentially the same as when formally implemented in 1920. It is a very useful tool for organizing and keeping track of naval vessels, and also provides the basis for the identification numbers painted on the bows (and frequently the sterns) of most U.S. Navy ships.

The ship designator and hull number system's roots extend back to the late 1880s when ship type serial numbers were assigned to most of the new-construction warships of the emerging "Steel Navy". During the course of the next thirty years, these same numbers were combined with filing codes used by the Navy's clerks to create an informal version of the system that was put in place in 1920. Limited usage of ship numbers goes back even earlier, most notably to the "Jeffersonian Gunboats" of the early 1800s and the "Tinclad" river gunboats of the Civil War Mississippi Squadron.

It is important to understand that hull number-letter prefixes are not acronyms, and should not be carelessly treated as abbreviations of ship type classifications. Thus, "DD" does not stand for anything more than "Destroyer". "SS" simply means "Submarine". And "FF" is the post-1975 type code for "Frigate."

The hull classification codes for ships in active duty in the United States Navy are governed under Secretary of the Navy Instruction 5030.8B.

Warships 
Warships are designed to participate in combat operations.

The origin of the two-letter code derives from the need to distinguish various cruiser subtypes.

Aircraft carrier type 
Aircraft carriers are ships designed primarily for the purpose of conducting combat operations by aircraft which engage in attacks against airborne, surface, sub-surface and shore targets. Contrary to popular belief, the "CV" hull classification symbol does not stand for "carrier vessel". "CV" derives from the cruiser designation, with one popular theory that the V comes from French voler, "to fly", but this has never been definitively proven. The V has long been used by the U.S. Navy for heavier-than-air craft and possibly comes from the French volplane. Aircraft carriers are designated in two sequences: the first sequence runs from CV-1 USS Langley to the very latest ships, and the second sequence, "CVE" for escort carriers, ran from CVE-1 Long Island to CVE-127 Okinawa before being discontinued.
 AV: Heavier-than-air aircraft tender, later Seaplane tender (retired)
 AVD: Seaplane tender destroyer (retired)
 AVP: Seaplane tender, Small (retired)
 AZ: Lighter-than-air aircraft tender (retired) (1920–23)
 AVG: General-purpose aircraft tender (repurposed escort carrier) (1941–42)
 AVT (i) Auxiliary aircraft transport (retired)
 AVT (ii) Auxiliary training carrier (retired)
 ACV: Auxiliary aircraft carrier (escort carrier, replaced by CVE) (1942)
 CV: Fleet aircraft carrier (1921–1975), multi-purpose aircraft carrier (1975–present)
 CVA: Aircraft carrier, attack (category merged into CV, 30 June 1975)
 CV(N): Aircraft carrier, night (deck equipped with lighting and pilots trained for nighttime fights) (1944) (retired)
 CVAN: Aircraft carrier, attack, nuclear-powered (category merged into CVN, 30 June 1975)
 CVB: Aircraft carrier, large (original USS Midway class, category merged into CVA, 1952)
 CVE: Aircraft carrier, escort (retired) (1943–retirement of type)
 CVHA: Aircraft carrier, helicopter assault (retired in favor of several LH-series amphibious assault ship hull codes)
 CVHE: Aircraft carrier, helicopter, escort (retired)
 CVL: Light aircraft carrier or aircraft carrier, small (retired)
 CVN: Aircraft carrier, nuclear-powered
 CVS: Antisubmarine aircraft carrier (retired)
 CVT: Aircraft carrier, training (changed to AVT (auxiliary))
 CVU: Aircraft carrier, utility (retired)
 CVG: Aircraft carrier, guided missile (retired)
 CF: Flight deck cruiser (1930s, retired unused)
 CVV: Aircraft carrier, vari-purpose, medium (retired unused)

Surface combatant type 
Surface combatants are ships which are designed primarily to engage enemy forces on the high seas. The primary surface combatants are battleships, cruisers and destroyers. Battleships are very heavily armed and armored; cruisers moderately so; destroyers and smaller warships, less so. Before 1920, ships were called "<type> no. X", with the type fully pronounced. The types were commonly abbreviated in ship lists to "B-X", "C-X", "D-X" et cetera—for example, before 1920,  would have been called "USS Minnesota, Battleship number 22" orally and "USS Minnesota, B-22" in writing. After 1920, the ship's name would have been both written and pronounced "USS Minnesota (BB-22)". In generally decreasing size, the types are:
 ACR: Armored cruiser (pre-1920)
 AFSB: Afloat forward staging base (also AFSB(I) for "interim", changed to MLP (Mobile Landing Platform, then ESD and ESB)
 B: Battleship (pre-1920)
 BB: Battleship
 BBG: Battleship, guided missile or arsenal ship (never used operationally)
 BM: Monitor (1920–retirement)
 C: Cruiser (pre-1920 protected cruisers and peace cruisers)
 CA: (first series) Cruiser, armored (retired, comprised all surviving pre-1920 armored and protected cruisers)
 CA: (second series) Heavy cruiser, category later renamed gun cruiser (retired)
 CAG: Cruiser, heavy, guided missile (retired)
 CB:  Large cruiser (retired)
 CBC: Large command cruiser (never used operationally)
 CC: (first usage) Battlecruiser (never used operationally)
 CC: (second usage) Command cruiser (retired)
 CLC: Command cruiser, light (retired)
 CG: Cruiser, guided missile
 CGN: Cruiser, guided missile, nuclear-powered:  and 
 CL: Cruiser, light (retired)
 CLAA: Cruiser, light, anti-aircraft (retired)
 CLD: Cruiser-destroyer, light (never used operationally)
 CLG: Cruiser, light, guided missile (retired)
 CLGN: Cruiser, light, guided missile, nuclear-powered (never used operationally)
 CLK: Cruiser, hunter–killer (never used operationally)
 CM: Cruiser–minelayer (retired)
 CS: Scout cruiser (retired)
 CSGN: Cruiser, strike, guided missile, nuclear-powered (never used operationally)
 D: Destroyer (pre-1920)
 DD: Destroyer
 DDC: Corvette (briefly proposed in the mid-1950s)
 DDE: Escort destroyer, a destroyer (DD) converted for antisubmarine warfare – category abolished 1962. (not to be confused with destroyer escort DE)
 DDG: Destroyer, guided missile
 DDK: Hunter–killer destroyer (category merged into DDE, 4 March 1950)
 DDR: Destroyer, radar picket (retired)
 DE: Destroyer escort (World War II, later became Ocean escort)
 DE: Ocean escort (abolished 30 June 1975)
 DEG: Guided missile ocean escort (abolished 30 June 1975)
 DER: Destroyer escort, radar picket (abolished 30 June 1975) There were two distinct breeds of DER, the DEs which were converted to DERs during World War II and the more numerous postwar DER conversions.
 DL: Destroyer leader (later frigate) (retired)
 DLG: Destroyer leader, guided missile (later frigate) (abolished 30 June 1975)
 DLGN: Destroyer leader, guided missile, nuclear-propulsion (later frigate) (abolished 30 June 1975) The DL category was established in 1951 with the abolition of the CLK category. CLK 1 became DL 1 and DD 927–930 became DL 2–5. By the mid-1950s the term destroyer leader had been dropped in favor of frigate. Most DLGs and DLGNs were reclassified as CGs and CGNs, 30 June 1975. However, DLG 6–15 became DDG 37–46. The old DLs were already gone by that time.
 DM: Destroyer, minelayer (retired)
 DMS: Destroyer, minesweeper (retired)
 FF: Frigate
 PF: Patrol frigate (retired)
 FFG: Frigate, guided missile
 FFH: Frigate with assigned helicopter
 FFL: Frigate, light
 FFR: Frigate, radar picket (retired)
 FFT: Frigate (reserve training) (retired) The FF, FFG, and FFR designations were established 30 June 1975 as new type symbols for ex-DEs, DEGs, and DERs. The first new-built ships to carry the FF/FFG designation were the s.
 PG: Patrol gunboat (retired)
 PCH: Patrol craft, hydrofoil (retired)
 PHM: Patrol, hydrofoil, missile (retired)
 K: Corvette (retired)
 LCS: Littoral combat ship In January 2015, the Navy announced that the up-gunned LCS will be reclassified as a frigate, since the requirements of the SSC Task Force was to upgrade the ships with frigate-like capabilities. The Navy is hoping to start retrofitting technological upgrades onto existing and under construction LCSs before 2019.
 LSES: Large Surface Effect Ship
 M: Monitor (1880s–1920)
 SES: Surface Effect Ship
 TB: Torpedo boat

Submarine type 
Submarines are all self-propelled submersible types (usually started with SS) regardless of whether employed as combatant, auxiliary, or research and development vehicles which have at least a residual combat capability. While some classes, including all diesel-electric submarines, are retired from USN service, non-U.S. navies continue to employ SS, SSA, SSAN, SSB, SSC, SSG, SSM, and SST types. With the advent of new Air Independent Propulsion/Power (AIP) systems, both SSI and SSP are used to distinguish the types within the USN, but SSP has been declared the preferred term. SSK, retired by the USN, continues to be used colloquially and interchangeably with SS for diesel-electric attack/patrol submarines within the USN, and, more formally, by the Royal Navy and British firms such as Jane's Information Group.
 SC: Cruiser Submarine (retired)
 SF: Fleet Submarine (retired)
 SM: Submarine Minelayer (retired)
 SS: Submarine, Attack Submarine
 SSA: Submarine Auxiliary, Auxiliary/Cargo Submarine
 SSAN: Submarine Auxiliary Nuclear, Auxiliary/Cargo Submarine, Nuclear-powered
 SSB: Submarine Ballistic, Ballistic Missile Submarine
 SSBN: Submarine Ballistic Nuclear, Ballistic Missile Submarine, Nuclear-powered
 SSC: Coastal Submarine, over 150 tons
 SSG: Guided Missile Submarine
 SSGN: Guided Missile Submarine, Nuclear-powered
 SSI: Attack Submarine (Diesel Air-Independent Propulsion)
 SSK: Hunter-Killer/ASW Submarine (retired)
 SSKN: Hunter-Killer/ASW Submarine, Nuclear-powered (retired)
 SSM: Midget Submarine, under 150 tons
 SSN: Attack Submarine, Nuclear-powered
 SSNR: Special Attack Submarine 
 SSO: Submarine Oiler (retired)
 SSP: Attack Submarine (Diesel Air-Independent Power) (alternate use), formerly Submarine Transport
 SSQ: Auxiliary Submarine, Communications (retired)
 SSQN: Auxiliary Submarine, Communications, Nuclear-powered (retired)
 SSR: Radar Picket Submarine (retired)
 SSRN: Radar Picket Submarine, Nuclear-powered (retired)
 SST: Training Submarine

 X: Midget submarine
 IXSS: Unclassified Miscellaneous Submarine
 MTS: Moored Training Ship (Naval Nuclear Power School Training Platform; reconditioned SSBNs and SSNs)

Patrol combatant type 
Patrol combatants are ships whose mission may extend beyond coastal duties and whose characteristics include adequate endurance and seakeeping, providing a capability for operations exceeding 48 hours on the high seas without support. This notably included Brown Water Navy/Riverine Forces during the Vietnam War. Few of these ships are in service today.
 PBR: Patrol Boat, River, Brown Water Navy (Pibber or PBR-Vietnam)
 PC: Coastal Patrol, originally Sub Chaser
 PCF: Patrol Craft, Fast; Swift Boat, Brown Water Navy (Vietnam)
 PE: Eagle Boat of World War I
 PF: World War II Frigate, based on British .
 PFG: Original designation of 
 PG: WWII-era Gunboats, later Patrol combatant, with ability to operate in rivers; what is generally known as River gunboats
 PGH: Patrol Combatant, Hydrofoil
 PHM: Patrol, Hydrofoil Missile
 PR: Patrol, River, such as the 
 PT: Patrol Torpedo Boat, the U.S. take on the Motor Torpedo Boat (World War II)
 PTF: Patrol Torpedo Fast, Brown Water Navy (Vietnam)
 PTG/PTGB: Patrol Torpedo Gunboat
 Monitor: Heavily gunned riverine boat, Brown Water Navy (Vietnam and prior). Named for 
 ASPB: Assault Support Patrol Boat, "Alpha Boat", Brown Water Navy; also used as riverine minesweeper (Vietnam)
 PACV: Patrol Air Cushion Vehicle, hovercraft that was part of the Brown Water Navy (Vietnam)
 SP: Section Patrol, used indiscriminately for patrol vessels, mine warfare vessels, and some other types (World War I; retired 1920)

Amphibious warfare type 
Amphibious warfare vessels include all ships having an organic capability for amphibious warfare and which have characteristics enabling long duration operations on the high seas. There are two classifications of craft: amphibious warfare ships, which are built to cross oceans, and landing craft, which are designed to take troops from ship to shore in an invasion.

The U.S. Navy hull classification symbol for a ship with a well deck depends on its facilities for aircraft:
 An LSD has a helicopter deck.
 An LPD has a hangar in addition to the helicopter deck.
 An LHD or LHA has a full-length flight deck.

Ships
 AKA: Attack Cargo Ship (To LKA, 1969)
 APA: Attack Transport (To LPA, 1969)
 APD: High speed transport (Converted Destroyer or Destroyer Escort) (To LPR, 1969)
 APM: Mechanized Artillery Transports (To LSD)
 AGC: Amphibious Force Flagship (To LCC, 1969)
 LCC: (second usage) Amphibious Command Ship
 LHA: General-Purpose Amphibious Assault Ship, also known as Landing ship, Helicopter, Assault
 LHD: Multi-Purpose Amphibious Assault Ship, also known as Landing ship, Helicopter, Dock
 LKA: Amphibious Cargo Ship (out of commission)
 LPA: Amphibious Transport
 LPD: Amphibious transport dock, also known as Landing ship, Personnel, Dock
 LPH: Landing ship, Personnel, Helicopter
 LPR: High speed transport
 LSD: Landing Ship, Dock
 LSH: Landing Ship, Heavy
 LSIL: Landing Ship, Infantry (Large) (formerly LCIL)
 LSL: Landing Ship, Logistics
 LSM: Landing Ship, Medium
 LSM(R): Landing Ship, Medium (Rocket)
 LSSL: Landing Ship, Support (Large) (formerly LCSL)
 LST: Landing Ship, Tank
 LST(H): Landing Ship, Tank (Hospital)
 LSV: Landing Ship, Vehicle

Landing Craft
 LCA: Landing Craft, Assault
 LCAC: Landing Craft Air Cushion
 LCC: (first usage) Landing Craft, Control
 LCFF: (Flotilla Flagship)
 LCH: Landing Craft, Heavy
 LCI: Landing Craft, Infantry, World War II-era classification further modified by
 (G) – Gunboat
 (L) – Large
 (M) – Mortar
 (R) – Rocket
 LCL: Landing Craft, Logistics (UK)
 LCM: Landing Craft, Mechanized
 LCP: Landing Craft, Personnel
 LCP(L): Landing Craft, Personnel, Large
 LCP(R): Landing Craft, Personnel, Ramped
 LCPA: Landing Craft, Personnel, Air-Cushioned
 LCS(L): Landing Craft, Support (Large) changed to LSSL in 1949
 LCT: Landing Craft, Tank (World War II era)
 LCU: Landing Craft, Utility
 LCVP: Landing Craft, Vehicle and Personnel
 LSH: Landing Ship Heavy (Royal Australian Navy)

Expeditionary support
Operated by Military Sealift Command, have ship prefix "USNS", hull code begins with "T-".
 ESD: Expeditionary Transfer Dock
 ESB: Expeditionary Mobile Base (a variant of ESD, formerly AFSB)
 EPF: Expeditionary fast transport
 MLP: Mobile landing platform (changed to ESD)
 JHSV: Joint high-speed vessel (changed to EPF)
 HST: High-speed transport (similar to JHSV, not to be confused with WWII-era High-speed transport (APD))
 HSV: High-speed vessel

Mine warfare type 
Mine warfare ships are those ships whose primary function is mine warfare on the high seas.
 ADG: Degaussing ship
 AM: Minesweeper
 AMb: Harbor minesweeper
 AMc: Coastal minesweeper
 AMCU: Underwater mine locater
 AMS: Motor minesweeper
 CM: Cruiser (i.e., large) minelayer
 CMc: Coastal minelayer
 DM: High-speed minelayer (converted destroyer)
 DMS: High-speed minesweeper (converted-destroyer)
 MCM: Mine countermeasures ship
 MCS: Mine countermeasures support ship
 MH(C)(I)(O)(S): Minehunter, (coastal) (inshore) (ocean) (hunter and sweeper, general)
 MLC: Coastal minelayer
 MSC: Minesweeper, coastal
 MSF: Minesweeper, steel hulled
 MSO: Minesweeper, ocean
 PCS: Submarine chasers (wooden) fitted for minesweeping
 YDG: District degaussing vessel

Coastal defense type 
Coastal defense ships are those whose primary function is coastal patrol and interdiction.
 FS: Corvette
 PB: Patrol boat
 PBR: Patrol boat, river
 PC: Patrol, coastal
 PCE: Patrol craft, escort
 PCF: Patrol craft, fast, (swift boat)
 PCS: Patrol craft, sweeper (modified-motor minesweepers meant for anti-submarine warfare)
 PF: Frigate, in a role similar to World War II Commonwealth corvette
 PG: Patrol gunboat
 PGM: Motor gunboat (To PG, 1967)
 PR: Patrol, river
 SP: Section patrol

Auxiliaries 
An auxiliary ship is designed to operate in any number of roles supporting combatant ships and other naval operations.

Combat logistics type 
Ships which have the capability to provide underway replenishment (UNREP) to fleet units.
 AE: Ammunition ship
 AF: Stores ship (retired)
 AFS: Combat stores ship
 AK: Dry cargo ship
 AKE: Advanced dry cargo ship
 AKS: General stores ship
 AO: Fleet Oiler
 AOE: Fast combat support ship
 AOR: Replenishment oiler
 AVS: Aviation Stores Issue Ship (retired)

Mobile logistics type 
Mobile logistics ships have the capability to provide direct material support to other deployed units operating far from home ports.
 AC: Collier (retired)
 AD: Destroyer tender
 AGP: Patrol craft tender
 AR: Repair ship
 ARB: Repair ship, battle damage
 ARC: Repair ship, cable
 ARG: Repair ship, internal combustion engine
 ARH: Repair ship, heavy-hull
 ARL: Repair ship, landing craft
 ARV: Repair ship, aircraft
 ARVH: Repair ship, aircraft, helicopter
 AS: Submarine tender
 AW: Distilling ship (retired)

Support ships 
Support ships are not designed to participate in combat and are generally not armed. For ships with civilian crews (owned by and/or operated for Military Sealift Command and the Maritime Administration), the prefix T- is placed at the front of the hull classification.

Support ships are designed to operate in the open ocean in a variety of sea states to provide general support to either combatant forces or shore-based establishments. They include smaller auxiliaries which, by the nature of their duties, leave inshore waters.

 AB: Auxiliary Crane Ship (1920–41) 
 ACS: Auxiliary Crane Ship
 AG: Miscellaneous Auxiliary
 AGB: Icebreaker
 AGDE: Testing Ocean Escort 
 AGDS: Deep Submergence Support Ship
 AGEH: Hydrofoil, experimental 
 AGER: (i): Miscellaneous Auxiliary, Electronic Reconnaissance
 AGER: (ii): Environmental Research Ship
 AGF: Miscellaneous Command Ship
 AGFF: Testing Frigate 
 AGHS: Patrol combatant support ship—ocean or inshore
 AGL: Auxiliary vessel, lighthouse tender
 AGM: Missile Range Instrumentation Ship
 AGMR: Major Communications Relay Ship
 AGOR: Oceanographic Research Ship
 AGOS: Ocean Surveillance Ship
 AGR: Radar picket ship
 AGS: Surveying Ship
 AGSC: Coastal Survey Ships
 AGSE: Submarine and Special Warfare Support
 AGTR: Technical research ship
 AH: Hospital ship
 AKD: Cargo Ship, Dock 
 AKL: Cargo Ship, Small
 AKN: Cargo Ship, Net
 AKR: Cargo Ship, Vehicle
 AKV: Cargo Ship, Aircraft
 AN: Net laying ship
 AOG: Gasoline tanker
 AOT: Transport Oiler
 AP: Transport
 APB: Self-propelled Barracks Ship
 APC: Coastal Transport
 APc: Coastal Transport, Small
 APH: Evacuation Transport
 APL: Barracks Craft
 ARS: Rescue and Salvage Ship
 ARSD: Salvage Lifting Vessels
 ASR: Submarine Rescue Ship
 AT: Fleet Tug
 ATA: Auxiliary Ocean Tug
 ATF: Fleet Ocean Tug
 ATLS: Drone Launch Ship
 ATO: Fleet Tug, Old
 ATR: Rescue Tug
 ATS: Salvage and Rescue Ship
 AVB(i): Aviation Logistics Support Ship
 AVB(ii): Advance Aviation Base Ship
 AVM: Guided Missile Ship 
 AVT(i): Auxiliary Aircraft Transport
 AVT(ii): Auxiliary Aircraft Landing Training Ship
 EPCER: Experimental – Patrol Craft Escort – Rescue
 PCER: Patrol Craft Escort – Rescue 
 SBX: Sea-based X-band Radar – a mobile active electronically scanned array early-warning radar station.

Service type craft 
Service craft are navy-subordinated craft (including non-self-propelled) designed to provide general support to either combatant forces or shore-based establishments. The suffix "N" refers to non-self-propelled variants.
 AFDB: Large Auxiliary Floating Dry Dock
 AFD/AFDL: Small Auxiliary Floating Dry Dock
 AFDM: Medium Auxiliary Floating Dry Dock
 ARD: Auxiliary Repair Dry Dock
 ARDM: Medium Auxiliary Repair Dry Dock  
 JUB/JB : Jack Up Barge

Submersibles 
 DSRV: Deep Submergence Rescue Vehicle
 DSV: Deep Submergence Vehicle
 NR: Submersible Research Vehicle

Yard and district craft
 YC: Open Lighter
 YCF: Car Float
 YCV: Aircraft Transportation Lighter
 YD: Floating Crane
 YDT: Diving Tender
 YF: Covered Lighter
 YFB: Ferry Boat or Launch
 YFD: Yard Floating Dry Dock
 YFN: Covered Lighter (non-self propelled)
 YFNB: Large Covered Lighter (non-self propelled)
 YFND: Dry Dock Companion Craft (non-self propelled)
 YFNX: Lighter (Special purpose) (non-self propelled)
 YFP: Floating Power Barge
 YFR: Refrigerated Cover Lighter
 YFRN: Refrigerated Covered Lighter (non-self propelled)
 YFRT: Range Tender USNS Range Recoverer (T-AG-161)
 YFU: Harbor Utility Craft
 YG: Garbage Lighter
 YGN: Garbage Lighter (non-self propelled)
 YH: Ambulance boat/small medical support vessel
 YLC: Salvage Lift Craft
 YM: Dredge
 YMN: Dredge (non-self propelled)
 YNG: Net Gate Craft
 YN: Yard Net Tender
 YNT: Net Tender
 YO: Fuel Oil Barge
 YOG: Gasoline Barge
 YOGN: Gasoline Barge (non-self propelled)
 YON: Fuel Oil Barge (non-self propelled)
 YOS: Oil Storage Barge
 YP: Patrol Craft, Training
 YPD: Floating Pile Driver
 YR: Floating Workshop
 YRB: Repair and Berthing Barge
 YRBM: Repair, Berthing and Messing Barge
 YRDH: Floating Dry Dock Workshop (Hull)
 YRDM: Floating Dry Dock Workshop (Machine)
 YRR: Radiological Repair Barge nuclear ships and submarines service
 YRST: Salvage Craft Tender
 YSD: Seaplane Wrecking Derrick - Yard Seaplane Derrick
 YSR: Sludge Removal Barge
 YT:  Harbor Tug (craft later assigned YTB, YTL, or YTM classifications)
 YTB: Large Harbor tug
 YTL: Small Harbor Tug
 YTM: Medium Harbor Tug
 YTT: Torpedo trials craft
 YW: Water Barge
 YWN: Water Barge (non-self propelled)

Miscellaneous ships and craft
 ID or Id. No.: Civilian ship taken into service for auxiliary duties, used indiscriminately for large ocean-going ships of all kinds and coastal and yard craft (World War I; retired 1920)
 IX: Unclassified Miscellaneous Unit
 "none": To honor her unique historical status, USS Constitution, formerly IX 21, was reclassified to "none", effective 1 September 1975.

Airships 
Although technically aircraft, pre-World War II rigid airships were treated like commissioned surface warships and submarines, flew the U.S. ensign from their stern and carried a United States Ship (USS) designation. Lighter-than-air aircraft (e.g., blimps) continued to fly the U.S. ensign from their stern but were always considered to be primarily aircraft.

Rigid airships:
 ZR: Rigid airship
 ZRS: Rigid airship scout 
 ZRCV: Rigid airship aircraft carrier, proposed, not built

Lighter-than-air aircraft:
 ZMC: Metal clad aircraft
 ZNN-G: G-class blimp
 ZNN-J: J-class blimp
 ZNN-L: L-class blimp
 ZNP-K: K-class blimp
 ZNP-M: M-class blimp
 ZNP-N: N-class blimp
 ZPG-3W: surveillance patrol blimp

Temporary designations
United States Navy Designations (Temporary) are a form of U.S. Navy ship designation, intended for temporary identification use. Such designations usually occur during periods of sudden mobilization, such as that which occurred prior to, and during, World War II or the Korean War, when it was determined that a sudden temporary need arose for a ship for which there was no official Navy designation.

During World War II, for example, a number of commercial vessels were requisitioned, or acquired, by the U.S. Navy to meet the sudden requirements of war. A yacht acquired by the U.S. Navy during the start of World War II might seem desirable to the Navy whose use for the vessel might not be fully developed or explored at the time of acquisition.

On the other hand, a U.S. Navy vessel, such as the yacht in the example above, already in commission or service, might be desired, or found useful, for another need or purpose for which there is no official designation.
 IX: Unclassified Miscellaneous Auxiliary Ship, for example, yacht Chanco acquired by the U.S. Navy on 1 October 1940. It was classified as a minesweeper , but instead, mainly used as a patrol craft along the New England coast. When another assignment came, and it could not be determined how to classify the vessel, it was redesignated IX-175 on 10 July 1944.

Numerous other U.S. Navy vessels were launched with a temporary, or nominal, designation, such as YMS or PC, since it could not be determined, at the time of construction, what they should be used for. Many of these were vessels in the 150 to 200 feet length class with powerful engines, whose function could be that of a minesweeper, patrol craft, submarine chaser, seaplane tender, tugboat, or other. Once their destiny, or capability, was found or determined, such vessels were reclassified with their actual designation.

United States Coast Guard vessels 

Prior to 1965, U.S. Coast Guard cutters used the same designation as naval ships but preceded by a "W" to indicate Coast Guard commission. The U.S. Coast Guard considers any ship over 65 feet in length with a permanently assigned crew, a cutter.

Current USCG cutter classes and types

Historic USCG cutter classes and types

USCG classification symbols definitions 
 CG: all Coast Guard ships in the 1920s (retired)
 WAGB: Coast Guard 
 WAGL: Auxiliary vessel, lighthouse tender (retired 1960's)
 WAVP: seagoing Coast Guard seaplane tenders (retired 1960s)
 WDE: seagoing Coast Guard destroyer escorts (retired 1960s)
 WHEC: Coast Guard high endurance cutters
 WIX: Coast Guard barque 
 WLB: Coast Guard buoy tenders
 WLBB: Coast Guard seagoing buoy tenders/ice breaker
 WLI: Coast Guard inland buoy tenders
 WLIC: Coast Guard inland construction tenders
 WLM: Coast Guard coastal buoy tenders
 WLR: Coast Guard river buoy tenders
 WMEC: Coast Guard medium endurance cutters
 WMSL: Coast Guard maritime security cutter, large (referred to as national security cutters)
 WPB: Coast Guard patrol boats
 WPC: Coast Guard patrol craft—later reclassed under WHEC, symbol reused for Coast Guard patrol cutter (referred to as fast response cutters)
 WPG: seagoing Coast Guard gunboats (retired 1960s)
 WTGB: Coast Guard tug boat (140' icebreakers)
 WYTL: Small harbor tug

USCG classification symbols for small craft and boats 
 MLB: Motor Life Boat (52', 47', and 44' variants)
 UTB: Utility Boat 
 DPB: Deployable Pursuit Boat
 ANB: Aids to Navigation Boats
 TPSB: Transportable Port Security Boat
 RHIB: Rigid Hull Inflatable Boats
 SRB: Surf Rescue Boat (30')

National Oceanic and Atmospheric Administration hull codes 
 R: Research ships, including oceanographic and fisheries research ships
 S: Survey ships, including hydrographic survey ships

The letter is paired with a three-digit number. The first digit of the number is determined by the ships "power tonnage," defined as the sum of its shaft horsepower and gross international tonnage, as follows:
 If the power tonnage is 5,501 through 9,000, the first digit is "1".
 If the power tonnage 3,501 through 5,500, the first digit is "2."
 If the power tonnage is 2,001 through 3,500, the first digit is "3."
 If the power tonnage is 1,001 through 2,000, the first digit is "4."
 If the power tonnage is 501 through 1,000, the first digit is "5."

The second and third digits are assigned to create a unique three-digit hull number.

See also 
 United States Navy 1975 ship reclassification
 List of hull classifications - same as this article but in alphabetical order
 List of ships of the United States Army
 Ship prefix
 Hull classification symbol (Canada)
 Pennant number for the British Commonwealth equivalent

Notes

Explanatory notes

Wikilink footnotes

Citations

General and cited references 

 
 United States Naval Aviation 1910–1995, Appendix 16: U.S. Navy and Marine Corps Squadron Designations and Abbreviations. U.S. Navy, c. 1995. Quoted in Derdall and DiGiulian, op cit.
 
 USCG Designations
 Naval History and Heritage Command Online Library of Selected Images: U.S. Navy Ships – Listed by Hull Number: "SP" #s and "ID" #s — World War I Era Patrol Vessels and other Acquired Ships and Craft
 Wertheim, Eric. The Naval Institute Guide to Combat Fleets of the World, 15th Edition: Their Ships, Aircraft, and Systems. Annapolis, Maryland: Naval Institute Press, 2007. . .

Further reading 
 Friedman, Norman. U.S. Small Combatants, Including PT-Boats, Subchasers, and the Brown-Water Navy: An Illustrated Design History. Annapolis, Md: Naval Institute Press, 1987. .

External links 
 Current U.S. Navy Ship Classifications
 U.S. Navy Inactive Classification Symbols
 U.S. Naval Vessels Registry (Service Craft)
 U.S. Naval Vessels Registry (Ships)
 U.S. Naval Vessel Register (Current ships)

Ships of the United States Navy
Ship identification numbers
Hull classifications
United States
Service vessels of the United States